Cranichis muscosa, the cypress-knee helmet orchid, is a species of terrestrial orchid. It is widespread across most of the West Indies, extending into Central America, southern Mexico, Belize, northern South America, and southern Florida.

References

External links 

US Department of Agriculture plants profile
IOSPE orchid photos, Cranichis muscosa Sw. 1788 Photo © by Prem Subrahmanyam and his The Florida Native Blog
Plants of Saint Lucia, wild flowering plants, Cranichis muscosa 
Plants of the Eastern Caribbean, Cranichis muscosa
Swiss Orchid Foundation at the Herbarium Jany Renz, Cranichis muscosa 
Lachaussette Rouge, Cranichis muscosa photo gallery
Florida Native Orchid Blog, Friday, February 6, 2009, hanging on by thread, Cranichis muscosa

Cranichidinae
Orchids of Central America
Orchids of Belize
Orchids of South America
Orchids of Mexico
Orchids of Florida
Flora of the Caribbean
Plants described in 1788
Taxa named by Olof Swartz